Sonia Solicari is a British curator and museum director at Museum of the Home. Solicari has been the Director of the Museum of the Home, in Hoxton, London, since January 2017. Solicari is also co-director of the Centre for Studies of Home, a partnership with Queen Mary, University of London and an international hub for research on the home, past, present and future.

Biography

Early life and education
Solicari was born in London to Italian parents and grew up in Enfield, north London.

Solicari completed her undergraduate studies in English Literature at Royal Holloway, University of London, followed by postgraduate degrees in Nineteenth-Century Studies at King's College London and Museum Studies at University College London.

Career
Solicari began her career on the Victoria and Albert Museum's development programme for assistant curators, where she worked at the V&A for eight years as a curator of paintings and later ceramics and glass.

Previously she was head of the Guildhall Art Gallery in the City of London.

Museum of the Home
In 2017, Solicari became Director of the Museum of the Home (formerly the Geffrye Museum of the Home) in Hoxton, east London. She succeeded David Dewing who had run the Museum for 25 years.

As Director of the museum, Solicari has overseen an £18.1 million capital development project to expand and transform the site. The restoration of the Grade I Listed museum buildings was overseen by architects Wright & Wright who created 80% more space for events, collections and exhibitions.

Solicari also oversaw the rebranding of the museum, with the name changed to the Museum of the Home to better reflect the collections and to reflect the changes over time in the museum's focus.

With Alison Blunt, Solicari is co-director of the Centre for Studies of Home, a collaboration with Queen Mary, University of London.

References 

1978 births
Living people
Alumni of King's College London
Directors of museums in the United Kingdom
British curators
British women curators